Meganthias is a genus of marine ray-finned fish from the subfamily Anthiinae, part of the family Serranidae, the groupers and sea basses. They are found in the Indo-Pacific region and the eastern Atlantic Ocean.

Species
The following four species are classified within the genus Meganthias:

 Meganthias carpenteri Anderson, 2006 (Yellowtop jewelfish)
 Meganthias filiferus Randall & Heemstra, 2008 (Filamentous anthiine)
 Meganthias kingyo (Kon, Yoshino & Sakurai, 2000) (Japanese anthiine or Giant anthias)
 Meganthias natalensis (Fowler, 1925) (Gorgeous swallowtail)

References

Anthiinae
Taxa named by John Ernest Randall